Angus is an unincorporated hamlet in Nuckolls County, Nebraska, United States, located approximately seven miles south of Edgar. A sod house was built there in 1967 to celebrate the town's centennial. A small piece of wall with a window remained as late as 2006, but may have fallen since.  Google Maps never bothered to image Angus.

The community was named after J. B. Angus, a railroad man.

References

External links
Photo of the sod house window
Angus Nebraska Website

Unincorporated communities in Nebraska
Unincorporated communities in Nuckolls County, Nebraska